"Phenomenon" is a song by Thousand Foot Krutch and is the first track on the album of the same name, released in 2003.

The song is about "standing up for what you believe in." as McNevan describes it. The song was also No. 1 on ChristianRock.Net along with their songs, "Bounce", and "Rawkfist". The song also peaked at No. 37 on the R&R Active Rock charts.

Personnel 
 Trevor McNevan - vocals and guitar
 Joel Bruyere - bass
 Steve Augustine - drums

References

External links 

2003 songs
Thousand Foot Krutch songs
Songs written by Trevor McNevan
Tooth & Nail Records singles

it:Phenomenon#Musica